Arne Ruste (born 14 February 1942) is a Norwegian poet, essayist, novelist, and magazine editor. He made his literary debut in 1973 with the poetry collection Askeladd. He co-edited the magazine Poesi Magasin from 1983 to 1985. He was manager of The Norwegian Writers' Center from 1994 to 1999. Ruste was awarded the Gyldendal's Endowment in 1978.

References

1942 births
Living people
20th-century Norwegian poets
Norwegian male poets
20th-century Norwegian novelists
21st-century Norwegian novelists
Norwegian essayists
Norwegian magazine editors
Norwegian male novelists
Male essayists
20th-century essayists
21st-century essayists
20th-century Norwegian male writers
21st-century Norwegian male writers